Antiguraleus  multistriatus is a species of sea snail, a marine gastropod mollusk in the family Mangeliidae.

Description
The length of the shell attains 8 mm, its diameter 3.7 mm.

Distribution
This species occurs off Chatham Rise, New Zealand, at depths between 530–600 m.

References

 Dell, Richard Kenneth. The archibenthal mollusca of New Zealand. Dominion Museum, 1956.
 Powell, A.W.B. 1979: New Zealand Mollusca: Marine, Land and Freshwater Shells, Collins, Auckland (p. 239)
 Spencer, H.G., Marshall, B.A. & Willan, R.C. (2009). Checklist of New Zealand living Mollusca. pp 196–219. in: Gordon, D.P. (ed.) New Zealand inventory of biodiversity. Volume one. Kingdom Animalia: Radiata, Lophotrochozoa, Deuterostomia. Canterbury University Press, Christchurch.

External links
 New Zealand Mollusca: Propebela multistriata
 Biolib.cz: Image of Antiguraleus multistriatus 

multistriatus
Gastropods described in 1956
Gastropods of New Zealand